Maryam Nawaz Sharif (Punjabi and ; born 28 October 1973), also known as Maryam Safdar, is a Pakistani politician and the daughter of former Prime Minister of Pakistan Nawaz Sharif. She was initially involved in the family's philanthropic organisations. However, in 2012, she entered politics and was put in charge of the election campaign during the 2013 general elections. In 2013, she was appointed the Chairperson of the Prime Minister's Youth Programme. However, she resigned in 2014 after her appointment was challenged in the Lahore High Court.

Early life and education

Maryam was born on 28 October 1973 in Lahore, Pakistan, to Nawaz Sharif and Kulsoom Butt. The Sharifs are the Kashmiris of Punjab.

She received her early education from the Convent of Jesus and Mary, Lahore. She wanted to become a doctor, hence she enrolled in King Edward Medical College in the late 1980s; however, after a controversy over illegal admission arose, she had to leave the college without completing her degree.

In 1992, she married Safdar Awan at the age of 19 and assumed her husband's surname as Mariam Safdar. Awan was serving as captain in the Pakistan Army at that time and was the security officer of Nawaz Sharif during the latter's tenure as Prime Minister of Pakistan. She has three children with Safdar Awan: One son, Junaid, and two daughters, Mahnoor and Mehr-un-Nisa.

In 2015, on the invitation of Nawaz Sharif, Narendra Modi attended the wedding of Maryam's daughter in Pakistan.

She completed undergraduate studies from the University of Punjab, from where she received a master's degree in literature. In 2012, she was doing her Ph.D. degree on post-9/11 radicalization in Pakistan.

In 2014, her degrees in M.A. (English Literature) and Ph.D. in Political Science were questioned by the Lahore High Court. It was unclear whether her Ph.D. degree was earned or honorary. In 2018, she only declared her master's degree in English Literature while submitting records to the Election Commission of Pakistan.

Following the 1999 Pakistani coup d'état, she remained under house arrest for four months before being sent to exile in Saudi Arabia together with the members of the Sharif family.

Political career 
Prior to entering politics, she remained involved in the family's philanthropic organisation and served as the chairperson of Sharif Trust, Sharif Medical City, and Sharif Education Institutes.

In November 2011, Nawaz Sharif granted her permission to enter politics after she expressed her intention to do so. During her political debut, she began visiting educational institutes to give speeches on education and women's rights.

In January 2012, she tweeted "I'm only assisting Nawaz Sharif to monitor their cyber cell. No intentions of getting into electoral or practical politics". She was put in charge of Nawaz Sharif's election campaign during the 2013 Pakistani general election where she reportedly played a prominent role.

She was regarded as "heir apparent" of Nawaz Sharif and the "presumed future leader" of the PML-N.

In November 2013, she was appointed the chairperson of the Prime Minister's Youth Programme. However, her appointment was called into question by the Pakistan Tehreek-e-Insaf (PTI) which termed the appointment a case of nepotism and moved the Lahore High Court in October 2014. PTI also accused her of misusing government funds for her own image-building. On 12 November 2014, the Lahore High Court ordered the federal government to remove her. The next day, Maryam resigned from the post of the chairpersonship.

In March 2017, she was selected as one of the BBC's 100 Women. In December 2017, she was featured on The New York Times list of 11 Powerful Women Around the World for the year 2017.

She became politically active in 2017 after her father Nawaz Sharif was disqualified and convicted by the Supreme Court of Pakistan in relation to the Panama Papers case and money laundering through having an employment in UAE. She campaigned for her mother, Kulsoom Nawaz, during the by-elections in Constituency NA-120.

In June 2018, she was allocated a PML-N ticket to contest the 2018 general election from Constituency NA-127 (Lahore-V) and PP-173. In July, she was sentenced to 7 years' jail on corruption charges in Avenfield reference filed by the National Accountability Bureau. As a result, she was disqualified from contesting elections for 10 years. Following which PML-N nominated Ali Pervaiz and Malik Irfan Shafi Khokhar to contest the 2018 elections in constituency NA-127 and PP-173, respectively. On 29 September 2022, Islamabad High Court overturned her corruption conviction and she is now eligible to contest elections.

On 8 August 2019, she was arrested by the National Accountability Bureau Lahore over the Chaudhry Sugar Mills corruption charges. In November 2019, she was released on bail by the Lahore High Court over the Chaudhry Sugar Mills Corruption charges.

On 3 January 2023, Maryam Nawaz was appointed as Senior Vice President of Pakistan Muslim League (N). The decision was approved by the President of the party, Shehbaz Sharif. She was also appointed as the "Chief Organizer" of the party with the mandate to restructuring and reorganizing the party at all levels.

Panama Papers case

On 3 April 2016, the Panama Papers were leaked and Maryam was named in it along with her two brothers, Hussain Nawaz and Hassan Nawaz. According to records uncovered by the International Consortium of Investigative Journalists (ICIJ), Maryam was described as the owner of the British Virgin Islands-based firms Nielsen Enterprises Limited and Nescoll Limited, and allegedly the owner of the properties in the United Kingdom owned jointly by her brothers. In reaction, Maryam denied owning any company or property outside Pakistan and said, "My brother has made me a trustee in one of his corporations which only entitles me to distribute assets to my brother Hussain's family/children if needed".

In September 2016, the Pakistan Tehreek-e-Insaf (PTI) filed a petition in the Supreme Court of Pakistan asking for action against Prime Minister Nawaz Sharif and his family members for their alleged involvement in the Panama Papers scandal. In January 2017, Maryam submitted her statement to the Supreme Court saying she has not been dependent on her father Nawaz Sharif since her marriage in 1992. On 16 February 2017, the lawyer of Maryam admitted before the Supreme Court that Maryam owned four flats in London for at least six months in 2006. On 20 April, the Supreme Court announced a split verdict and ordered the formation of the joint investigation team (JIT) to investigate the Sharif family's assets for irregularities. On 10 July, the JIT submitted its report to the Supreme Court in which it maintained that the Sharif family has assets beyond known sources of income. In its report, the JIT noted that Maryam misled the Supreme Court by presenting fake documents and stated that the Calibri font used on the declaration dated 2006 produced by Maryam was not commercially available before January 31, 2007. The scandal was widely referred to as Fontgate.

The Supreme Court announced its decision on 28 July 2017 and disqualified Nawaz Sharif from holding public office as he had been dishonest in not disclosing his employment in the Dubai-based Capital FZE company in his nomination papers. The court also ordered the National Accountability Bureau (NAB) to file a reference against Sharif and his family members against corruption charges.

In September 2017, the NAB filed three corruption references against Nawaz Sharif and his three children including Maryam in compliance with the Supreme Court verdict in the Panama Papers case. In October, an accountability court indicted Maryam, Nawaz Sharif, and Maryam's husband in the Avenfield reference—one of three corruption references filed by the NAB—which pertains to the ownership of the Sharif family's four flats at Avenfield, an apartment on Park Lane in London. After conducting 107 hearings of the Avenfield case since September 2017, the accountability court reserved its verdict in the case on 3 July 2018.

On 6 July 2018, she was sentenced to seven years in jail and two million pounds by the NAB on corruption charges in the Avenfield reference case. She was given seven years for abetment and one year for non-cooperation with the NAB. Both sentences will run concurrently. As a result, she was disqualified from contesting in elections for 10 years. The court held that the trust deeds presented by Maryam before the apex court were fake and had been tampered with. Her father, Nawaz Sharif, and her husband were also sentenced to ten years and one year in prison, respectively. The court also ordered the seizure of the Avenfield flats of the Sharif family.

The next day, Maryam announced that she would return to Pakistan on 13 July to file an appeal against the decision. The same day, the NAB announced their intention to arrest her and Nawaz Sharif upon their arrival in Pakistan and obtained the required arrest warrant. She, along with Nawaz Sharif, was taken into custody by the NAB on 13 July upon their arrival at Lahore's Allama Iqbal International Airport and were airlifted to Rawalpindi's Adyala jail. On 26 July, she challenged her sentence in the Islamabad High Court and filed a petition for bail. The next day, the Islamabad High Court rejected her request for release on bail and adjourned the hearing until the end of the 2018 Pakistani general election. During her time in detention, she spent significant amounts of time reading books.

On 21 August 2018, the Imran Khan-led federal government placed her on the Exit Control List in order to prevent her from leaving Pakistan. On 11 September, her mother, Kulsoom Nawaz, died in London. Maryam along with her father and husband were released from Adyala jail on parole. They were flown to Lahore to attend the funeral of her mother. Reportedly, Maryam and her father initially refused to be released on parole. The funeral of Kulsoom Nawaz was held on 14 September 2018. On 17 September, Maryam, together with her father and husband, was shifted to Adiala jail.

On 19 September 2018, the Islamabad High Court announced its verdict on the bail petition and suspended the prison sentences against Maryam, her father, and her husband, and ordered their release on bail. The court ordered them to pay Rs 500,000 each as surety bonds before their release. They were released from the Adiala jail the same day and were flown to Lahore.

Acquittal in corruption case 
A corruption conviction against Maryam, and her husband Muhammad Safdar has been reversed by an Islamabad High Court on 29 September 2022. Maryam Nawaz, the daughter of three-time former Prime Minister Nawaz Sharif, is now qualified to run for office following the Court's acquittal.

For assisting and aiding her father in the purchase of London flats that were acquired via dishonest means, Maryam had been given a seven-year prison sentence in July 2018. Safdar had also received a one-year sentence. Despite receiving a 10-year prison term for himself, Nawaz Sharif was granted bail in 2019 so he could travel to the United Kingdom for medical care. He hasn't been back since.

Maryam Nawaz, who was also granted bail in 2019, appealed the accountability court's 2018 decision before the Islamabad High Court in October of last year. After the decision on 29 September 2022, Maryam addressed the media and said that her father had endured more persecution than any other leader in the history of the nation.

Personal wealth 
In 2011 on a TV show with Pakistani Anchor Sana Bucha, Maryam said she owned no properties in central London let alone in Pakistan. It was later revealed in 2017 by a Joint Investigation Team that "she was the beneficiary of the London flats and she purposely never declared the ownership of these overseas properties, submitted fake documents, and misled the Supreme Court of Pakistan". Her conviction was overturned on 29 September 2022 related to the purchase of apartments in London. The two judge panel of the Islamabad High Court dismissed prosecution's case against her.

In 2018 in her affidavit to the Election Commission of Pakistan, Maryam declared her assets to be worth . She owns 1,506 Kanals (188 acres) of agricultural land and has invested millions into companies.

Audio leaks
Throughout the years, multiple audios of Maryam Nawaz have been leaked. Most recently on 24 September 2022, an audio was leaked where her uncle, who is the current Prime Minister of Pakistan, Shahbaz Sharif can be heard speaking to an unidentified man. In the audio the unidentified man is telling Maryam's uncle, Shahbaz Sharif, that Maryam is asking for a power plant from India to be imported for her son-in-law's business. Shahbaz Sharif then tells the unidentified man about the issues of importing a plant from India because it would be used against his government by the Former Prime Minister of Pakistan, Imran Khan.

References 

1973 births
Living people
21st-century Pakistani women politicians
Pakistani prisoners and detainees
Pakistani people of Kashmiri descent
Pakistan Muslim League (N) politicians
People convicted of forgery
People named in the Panama Papers
Politicians from Lahore
Children of prime ministers of Pakistan
Convent of Jesus and Mary, Lahore alumni
University of the Punjab alumni
Sharif family
Pakistani politicians convicted of crimes
Corruption in Pakistan
Plastic surgery
People known for their body modification